The Phlebotominae are a subfamily of the family Psychodidae. In several countries, their common name is sandfly; but that name is also applied to other flies. The Phlebotominae include many genera of blood-feeding (hematophagous) flies, including the primary vectors of leishmaniasis, bartonellosis and pappataci fever. In the New World, leishmaniasis is spread by sand flies in the genus Lutzomyia, which commonly live in caves, where their main hosts are bats.  In the Old World, sand flies in the genus Phlebotomus spread leishmaniasis.

Phlebotomine females, and only females, suck blood from various mammals, reptiles and birds. Some species are selective, whereas others bite any suitable host they find. Some species can produce one clutch of eggs before their first blood meal; such females are said to practise autogenous or partly autogenous reproduction. Other species need a blood meal before they can produce any eggs at all; they are said to practise anautogenous reproduction. As far as is known, all species need a blood meal for every following clutch of eggs. Proteins and other nutrients in the blood they eat enable the female to produce the proteins and fats necessary for them to produce eggs after using up their bodily food stores.  In feeding on blood, the flies use their mouthparts to start the host bleeding. They then suck up the exposed blood.  Like practically all blood-feeding parasites, they inject biochemicals that inhibit blood clotting, plus some that stimulate host mast cells to produce histamine; this distends capillary vessels, thereby promoting blood flow.

One blood meal can support the production of about 100 eggs. Females lay their eggs in humid soil rich in organic matter. Laboratory colonies of various phlebotomine sand flies species have been established for experimental study.

Sand flies are small; a body size of about 3mm in length is typical for many species, which aids them in escaping notice. Their bite is not always felt, but leaves a small round, reddish bump that starts itching hours or days later.  Use of insect repellent is recommended in areas where sand flies are present.

Distribution 
Phlebotomine sand flies can be found between the latitudes 50°N and 40°S, but are absent from New Zealand and the Pacific Islands.

Health concerns 

As sand fly females suck blood from vertebrate animals, including humans, they can transmit leishmaniasis, arboviruses and bartonellosis.

Prevention of sand fly-borne diseases 
Both sand fly sexes are found to consume plant-derived sugar meals as a source of energy, and certain plants upon which sand flies feed can shorten their life or reduce their capacity for transmitting leishmaniasis. Therefore, the structure of plant communities is found to influence the transmission dynamics of sand fly-borne diseases.

A next-generation sequencing (NGS)–based assay for determining the source of sand fly plant meals, based upon the chloroplast DNA gene ribulose bisphosphate carboxylase large chain (rbcL), found the predilection of several sand fly species, vectors of leishmaniasis in different parts of the world, prefer feeding on Cannabis sativa. The plant DNA detected in sand flies was from plant cells damaged by their mouthparts as they pierced plant tissues to reach the phloem.

Pollinator insects, including mosquitoes, are attracted to plants that emit volatile molecules such as terpene, and sixty-eight volatile compounds were detected and partially characterized in pollen and vegetative parts of Cannabis sativa by GC-MS. As cannabinoids from C. sativa exhibit antimicrobial activity against some bacteria and fungi, and a potent antileishmanial, and since thriving gut microbiomes are crucial for the development of Leishmania infections in the sand fly gut, a microbicidal effect could harm the infections.

Therefore, a novel approach for controlling blood-sucking mosquitoes and sand flies could be to exploit their plant feeding habit by utilizing attractive toxic sugar baits (ATSBs) that emit olfactory cues to attract the sand flies and mosquitoes through the addition of C. sativa plant extracts, augmenting the efficacy of ATSBs for controlling sugar-questing disease vectors.

Genera
Australophlebotomus Theodor, 1948
Bichromomyia Artemiev, 1991
Brumptomyia França & Parrot, 1921 (Mexico to South America)
Chinius Leng, 1985 (2 species: China, Thailand)
Dampfomyia Addis, 1945
Datzia Stebner et al.2015 (Burmese amber, Cenomanian)
Deanemyia Galati, 1995
Evandromyia Mangabeira, 1941
Edentomyia Galati, Andrade-Filho, da Silva & Falcão, 2003 (Brazil)
Expapillata Galati, 1995
Hertigia Fairchild, 1949
Idiophlebotomus Quate & Fairchild, 1961
Libanophlebotomus Azar et al. 1999 Lebanese amber, Barremian
Lutzomyia França, 1924 (North and South America)
Mandalayia Stebner et al.2015 (Burmese amber, Cenomanian)
Martinsmyia Galati, 1995
Mesophlebotomites Azar et al. 1999 Lebanese amber, Barremian
Micropygomyia Barretto, 1962
Migonemyia Galati, 1995
Nyssomyia Barretto, 1962
Oligodontomyia Galati, 1995
Palaeomyia Poinar 2004 Burmese amber, Albian
Phlebotomites Stebner et al.2015 Lebanese amber, Barremian, Burmese amber, Cenomanian
Phlebotoiella Solórzano Kraemer and Wagner 2009 Cambay amber, India, Eocene
Phlebotomus Rondani, 1995 & Berté, 1840 (Europe, Africa, Asia, Australia)
Pintomyia Costa Lima, 1932
Pressatia Mangabeira, 1942
Protopsychodinae Stebner et al.2015
Protopsychoda Azar et al. 1999 Lebanese amber, Barremian
Psathyromyia Barretto, 1962
Psychodopygus Mangabeira, 1941
Sciopemyia Barretto, 1962
Sergentomyia França & Parrot, 1920 (Europe, Africa, Asia, Australia)
Trichophoromyia Barretto, 1962
Viannamyia Mangabeira, 1941
Warileya Hertig, 1948 (Central and South America)

Gallery: anatomy of Phlebotominae

See also

 Use of DNA in forensic entomology

References

External links 
  
  
 CIPA Computer-aided Identification of Phlebotomine sand flies of America
 Lutzomyia shannoni, a sand fly on the UF / IFAS Featured Creatures website

Psychodidae
Nematocera subfamilies
Extant Barremian first appearances